Store Smådalshøi or Smådalshøe is a mountain in Lom Municipality in Innlandet county, Norway. The mountain is surrounded by several other notable mountains including Kvitingskjølen to the northeast; Heranoshøi to the east; Hindnubben and Stornubben to the southeast; Veslekjølen and Austre Hestlægerhøe to the south; Glittertinden, Trollsteineggje, and Trollsteinrundhøe to the southwest; Svartholshøe, Gråhøe, and Store Trollhøin to the west, and Finnshalspiggen, Lauvhøe, and Eisteinhovde to the northwest.

See also
List of mountains of Norway

References

Lom, Norway
Jotunheimen
Mountains of Innlandet